Bayergorgia is a monotypic genus of corals belonging to the family Plexauridae. The only species is Bayergorgia vermidoma.

The species is found in southernmost South America.

References

Plexauridae
Octocorallia genera
Monotypic cnidarian genera